The Legend of Mor'du is a 2012 Pixar short attached to the Blu-ray and DVD release of Brave. It gives in-depth background about the film's villain, an evil, greedy prince as told by the eccentric witch who transformed him into the monstrous bear that he is in the film. The film combines traditional animation and computer animation.

Plot
The story begins with the witch inviting a guest into her cottage and offering them several spells. When her crow suggests the bear spell, she tells the story of the prince who became the demon bear Mor'du. The man had been the eldest of four sons of the wise and much-beloved king of an ancient kingdom, each of whom had his own gift. Of the younger three, the youngest was wise, the third was compassionate, and the second was just. The king's eldest was strong, but he mistook strength for character. When the king died one autumn, rather than giving the eldest all the inheritance, he divided the kingdom among all of his sons equally, believing their kingdom could prosper through the brothers' unity. However, feeling disgraced and filled with greed and selfishness, the eldest son refused to accept this, proving his claim as the sole heir in front of his brothers by using one of his axes to break his image away from their family stone. His words turned to war, forever changing the kingdom's fate.

Even though the prince had a powerful army under his command, he and his brothers constantly fought to a stalemate. In looking for a way to change his fate, the prince came across a menhir ring within the woods. From there, the will-o'-the-wisps guided him to the edge of a dark loch, the witch's cottage standing far from the shore. Hoping to turn the tide of the war to his favor, the prince persuaded the witch to make a spell that would give him the strength of ten men by offering her his signet ring, and she gave him the spell in a drinking horn but, having seen darkness in his heart, warns him of making a choice: either to fulfill his dark wish or heal the family bonds he had broken. When the prince brought his brothers before him by staging up a false truce, he again claimed his kingdom. When his brothers protested, the prince in response drank the spell, which gave him the strength he desired but, to his surprise, turned him into a great black bear. However, instead of choosing to "mend the bond torn by pride" (which would have broken the spell), out of his desire for power the prince accepted his new form and killed his brothers. He then tried to get his army to rule the kingdom, but they saw him as a wild beast and attacked him in fear. Enraged by his former men turning against him, he attacked and killed many of them, with the few survivors fleeing the kingdom in terror; the decimation of the armies of the brothers in turn leading to the kingdom's collapse. Doomed to his bestial form because of his actions, the prince - now known as the "Great Black", "Mor'du" - wandered the land endlessly, killing and instilling terror wherever he roamed, his once human consciousness and intelligence now overwritten by animalistic bloodlust.

The witch ends the story here, and she offers the spell in the form of a cake to the guest, who turns out to be Wee Dingwall. He panics, says he only stopped by for water, and runs out of the cottage.

Cast
 Julie Walters as The Witch
 Steve Purcell as The Crow
 Callum O'Neill as Wee Dingwall
 Donald Sutherland as the king
 Bill Nighy as Mor'du

References

External links
 

2012 animated films
2012 short films
2010s American animated films
2010s animated short films
2010s war films
American animated short films
Animated films about bears
Brave (2012 film)
Films about royalty
Pixar short films
Films scored by Patrick Doyle
Films with screenplays by Steve Purcell
2010s English-language films